The 27th Armored Division was a United States Army formation.  It was part of the New York Army National Guard in the 1950s and 1960s.

Activation
In February, 1955 a reorganization of the Army National Guard included reorganizing the 27th Infantry Division as the 27th Armored Division. This included exchanging the black and red "NYD" (New York Division) shoulder patch for the triangle-shaped patch of the Army's armor divisions.  The 27th Armored Division was called the "Empire Division," after New York's nickname, the Empire State.

The division headquarters was originally in Buffalo, and was later moved to Syracuse.

Composition, 1955
In 1955, the composition of the 27th Armored Division was:

Headquarters & Headquarters Company, 27th Armored Division
Combat Commands A, B, and C

Infantry:

105th Armored Infantry Battalion
108th Armored Infantry Battalion
174th Armored Infantry Battalion
175th Armored Infantry Battalion

Armor:

127th Tank Battalion
205th Tank Battalion
208th Tank Battalion
274th Tank Battalion

Artillery:

Headquarters, 27th Armored Division Artillery (DIVARTY)
106th Armored Field Artillery Battalion
186th Armored Field Artillery Battalion
249th Armored Field Artillery Battalion
270th Armored Field Artillery Battalion
210th Antiaircraft Artillery Battalion (from 127th AAA)

Separate Units:

27th Armored Reconnaissance Battalion
152nd Armored Engineer Battalion
27th Armored Signal Battalion

Trains:

Headquarters and Headquarters Company, 27th Armored Division Trains
727th Armored Ordnance Battalion
134th Armored Medical Battalion
27th Armored Quartermaster Battalion
27th Military Police Company
27th Replacement Company

Composition, 1960
Headquarters & Headquarters Company, 27th Armored Division
Combat Commands A, B, and C

Infantry: armored rifle battalions

1st Battalion, 105th Infantry
1st Battalion, 108th Infantry
2nd Battalion, 108th Infantry
1st Battalion, 174th Infantry

Armor: medium tank battalions

1st Battalion, 127th Armor
1st Battalion, 174th Armor
1st Battalion, 205th Armor
1st Battalion, 108th Armor
1st Battalion, 210th Armor (from 210th Anti-aircraft Artillery)
1st Squadron, 121st Armor (from 27th Armored Reconnaissance Battalion)

Artillery:

Headquarters, 27th Armored Division Artillery (DIVARTY)

Howitzer battalions:
1st Battalion, 104th Artillery
1st Battalion, 180th Artillery
1st Battalion, 270th Artillery
1st Battalion (Rocket), 106th Artillery

Separate units:

127th Aviation Company
152nd Engineer Battalion
227th Signal Battalion (from 27th Signal Battalion).

Trains:

Headquarters and Headquarters Company, 27th Armored Division Trains
727th Armored Ordnance Battalion
134th Armored Medical Battalion
27th Armored Quartermaster Battalion
27th Military Police Company
227th Transportation Detachment (Aircraft Maintenance)
527th Administrative Company

Composition, 1966
Headquarters & Headquarters Company, 27th Armored Division
1st Brigade:
1st Battalion, 105th Infantry
1st Battalion, 205th Armor
1st Battalion, 210th Armor
2nd Brigade:
1st Battalion, 108th Infantry
2nd Battalion, 108th Infantry
1st Battalion, 208th Armor
3rd Brigade:
1st Battalion, 174th Infantry
1st Battalion, 127th Armor
2nd Battalion, 127th Armor
1st Battalion, 174th Armor
1st Squadron, 121st Cavalry
Headquarters, 27th Armored Division Artillery (DIVARTY):
1st Battalion, 104th Field Artillery
1st Battalion, 106th Field Artillery
1st Battalion, 156th Field Artillery
2nd Battalion, 156th Field Artillery
1st Battalion, 170th Field Artillery
Separate commands:
27th Armored Division Band
27th Administrative Company
27th Supply & Transportation Battalion
134th Medical Battalion
152nd Engineer Battalion
727th Maintenance Battalion

Commanders

Three individuals served as commander of the 27th Armored Division:

Major General Ronald C. Brock (1955–1957). Brock had been commander of the 27th Infantry Division. He subsequently served as commander of the New York National Guard.
MG Almerin C. O'Hara (1957–1959). O'Hara later served as commander of the New York National Guard, and state Commissioner of General Services.  When Albany County shifted to a county executive/county legislature form of government in 1975, O'Hara was the unsuccessful Republican nominee for Albany County Executive.
MG Collin P. Williams (1959–1968) Williams had served as commander of Combat Command B, 27th Armored Division and the division's Assistant Division Commander. He retired in 1968.

Deactivation
The 27th Armored Division was inactivated in February, 1968 during another reorganization of the Army National Guard. During its existence the 27th Armored Division was not activated for federal service and saw no combat. It was activated for state service, including the response to the 1964 Rochester riot.

Subsequent history

The division was reorganized in 1968 as the 27th Armored Brigade, a unit of the 50th Armored Division.

The 27th Armored Brigade was reorganized as an Infantry brigade in 1975 and aligned with the 42nd Infantry Division.

In 1985 the 27th Infantry Brigade was activated as part of the New York Army National Guard, and assigned as the "roundout" brigade of the Army's 10th Mountain Division.

The 27th Brigade was later reorganized as the 27th Infantry Brigade Combat Team, and reestablished use of the 27th Infantry Division's NYD shoulder sleeve insignia. The 27th Infantry Brigade carries on the lineage and history of the 27th Infantry Division.

References

27th Armored Division, U.S.
Divisions of the United States Army National Guard
Military units and formations established in 1955
Military units and formations disestablished in 1968
1955 establishments in New York (state)
1968 disestablishments in New York (state)